Epic Movie is a 2007 American parody film written and directed by Jason Friedberg and Aaron Seltzer and produced by Paul Schiff. It stars Kal Penn, Adam Campbell, Jayma Mays, Jennifer Coolidge, Faune A. Chambers, Crispin Glover, Tony Cox, and Fred Willard. A parody of the epic film genre, the film mostly references The Chronicles of Narnia: The Lion, the Witch and the Wardrobe, Harry Potter, Charlie and the Chocolate Factory, Pirates of the Caribbean, and X-Men.

The film was released on January 19, 2007, and it was unanimously panned by critics, and many have considered this to be one of the worst films of all time. Despite this, it however was fairly successful at the box office, earning $86.9 million worldwide, more than four times its $20 million budget. The song "Ms. New Booty" by Bubba Sparxxx gained commercial attention for being featured in Epic Movie.

Plot
Lucy finds that her adoptive father, a museum curator, has been attacked by Silas. Before dying, he gives clues that lead her to a "Golden Ticket" in a vending machine candy bar. During "comedic" situations, fellow orphans Edward, a disillusioned monk trainee; Susan, a displaced adopted girl; and Peter, a mutant at Mutant Academy who is often teased for his chicken-like wings, all find Golden Tickets. All four meet up at Willy's Chocolate Factory. Willy reveals his plot to use them all as a special ingredient in his treats.

Attempting to hide from the maniacal Willy, Lucy finds a wardrobe. On the other side, in the middle of a wintry forest, she finds Mr. Tumnus, who welcomes Lucy to Gnarnia and warns her of danger. The others follow Lucy to Gnarnia, and Edward meets the White Bitch. She convinces him to trap the other orphans in order to become the king of Gnarnia in her White Castle.

All four go to Tumnus' house, where they discover their relation to each other in a copy of the famous painting The Last Supper, and that the White Bitch killed their parents. They ally themselves with Harry Beaver, Tumnus' life partner, to defeat the White Bitch.

Edward sneaks off to the White Bitch's castle. When he refuses to reveal to her where the others are, she flashes him her breasts, hypnotizing him into giving up the information on the orphans, then imprisons him. The White Bitch sends Silas after the trio; Tumnus apparently sacrifices himself to ensure their safety.

Afterwards, the orphans meet a graying Harry Potter, along with a balding Ron Weasley and a pregnant Hermione Granger at Hogwarts. They all help Lucy, Susan, and Peter train for the war against the White Bitch.

Captain Jack Swallows helps Edward escape, only for Edward to find out it was a ruse as Jack, the Bitch's old enemy, needs intelligence out of Edward.

Upon finishing their training, Lucy, Susan, and Peter head to the camp of Aslo. Aslo agrees to help Edward and manages to kill Silas, but while breaking Edward out, he is slain by the White Bitch. As the orphans have a pre-battle party with their allies, Susan gets drunk and vomits everywhere, disgusting their army enough that nobody shows up to help the orphans the next day. The four siblings engage the White Bitch in battle and all (except for Peter) are killed. Peter then finds a magic remote and uses its powers to revive his siblings.

Together, they kill the army, defeat the White Bitch, and stop her plan. Peter declares the White Bitch will receive a fair and just trial in the new Gnarnia, but Jack's wheel accidentally crushes her to death. The four are crowned the new rulers of the land. Tumnus then shows up, having survived his battle. Decades later, the four now-elderly rulers find the wardrobe again and go through it. They appear moments after they had left, young again. They meet Borat, who congratulates them on a happy ending, but then, Jack's wheel accidentally runs over the quartet, killing them. Borat then says his iconic "NOT!" before turning around and clapping his buttocks, ending the film.

Extended version
The unrated, longer version (released in the United Kingdom as the "Rude & Crude Unseen Version") of the film features some scenes not shown in the theatrical version. In an alternate ending, Willy Wonka, instead of Borat, comes in and says: "I told you it was going to be an epic adventure." Willy Wonka then goes in the wardrobe and puts out a "do not disturb" sign that refers to the girl in the wardrobe. The Oompa-Loompas come in and start singing a parody version of the Willy Wonka theme song. The four are then crushed by the wheel. Also, during the scene where Lucy is crushed under the junk that falls out of the wardrobe, the girl who runs out is nude, as opposed to wearing a bikini. In the Snakes on a Plane scene, when the Samuel L. Jackson lookalike yells, he replaces "goddamn" with "motherfuckin'".

Cast
{| class=" sortable wikitable"
|-
! Actor/Actress
! Role
! Parody of
! Movie/TV
|-
| Kal Penn || Edward Pervertski || Edmund Pevensie/Kumar Patel/Augustus Gloop || The Chronicles of Narnia/Nacho Libre/Harold and Kumar Go to White Castle/Charlie and the Chocolate Factory
|-
| Adam Campbell || Peter Pervertski/Super Peter || Peter Pevensie/Angel/Superman/Charlie Bucket|| The Chronicles of Narnia/X-Men/Superman Returns/Charlie and the Chocolate Factory
|-
| Faune A. Chambers || Susan Pervertski || Susan Pevensie/Veruca Salt || The Chronicles of Narnia/Snakes on a Plane/Charlie and the Chocolate Factory
|-
| Jayma Mays || Lucy Pervertski || Lucy Pevensie/Violet Beauregard || The Chronicles of Narnia/The Da Vinci Code/Charlie and the Chocolate Factory
|-
| Jennifer Coolidge || The White Bitch of Gnarnia || White Witch/Davy Jones || The Chronicles of Narnia/Pirates of the Caribbean
|-
| Tony Cox || Bink || Ginarrbrik || The Chronicles of Narnia|-
| Hector Jimenez || Mr. Tumnus/Tony Fauntana || Mr Tumnus/Tony Montana || The Chronicles of Narnia/Scarface/MTV Cribs|-
| Jareb Dauplaise || Ignacio/Nacho || Nacho Libre ||Nacho Libre|-
| Crispin Glover || Willy || Willy Wonka || Charlie and the Chocolate Factory|-
| Darrell Hammond || Captain Jack Swallows || Jack Sparrow/Captain Morgan|| Pirates of the Caribbean/Captain Morgan|-
| Carmen Electra || Mystique || Herself || X-Men|-
| Jim Piddock || Magneto || Himself || X-Men|-
| Kevin Hart (uncredited) || Silas || Himself || The Da Vinci Code|-
| Fred Willard || Aslo || Aslan || The Chronicles of Narnia|-
| David Carradine || The Curator || Jacques Saunière || The Da Vinci Code|-
| Katt Williams || Harry Beaver || Mr. Beaver || The Chronicles of Narnia and Bell Canada reference in scene with PDA
|-
| Danny Jacobs || Borat Sagdiyev || Himself || Borat|-
| Nick Steele || Lead Archer || None || The Chronicles of Narnia|-
| Gregory Jbara || Mel Gibson || Himself ||
|-
| David Lehre || Ashton Kutcher || Himself || Punk'd|-
| Kevin McDonald || Harry Potter || Himself || Harry Potter series|-
| George Alvarez || Ron Weasley || Himself || Harry Potter series|-
| Crista Flanagan || Hermione Granger || Herself || Harry Potter series|-
| Alla Petrou || Paris Hilton || Herself || 
|-
| James Walker, Sr. || Samuel "God Damn"/"Motherfuckin'" Jackson || Samuel L. Jackson/Agent Neville Flynn || Snakes on a Plane|-
| Abe Spigner || Flavor Flav || Himself || Flavor of Love|-
| Lauren Conrad|| Herself || Herself || The Hills
|-
| Vince Vieluf || Wolverine || Himself || X-Men series
|-
| Lindsey Kraft || Rogue || Herself || X-Men|-
| Scott L. Schwartz || Hagrid || Himself || Harry Potter series 
|-
| Roscoe Lee Browne || Narrator || None || 
|-
| Tad Hilgenbrink || Cyclops || Himself || X-Men|-
| Audra Lynn || Wardrobe Girl || None||
|-
| Anwar Burton || Michael Jackson || Himself ||
|-
| Darko Belgrade || James Bond || Himself || James Bond series
|-
| Dane Farwell || Albus Dumbledore || Himself || Harry Potter series
|-
| Kahshanna Evans || Storm || Herself || X-Men trilogy
|-
| Rico Rodriguez || Chanchito || Chancho ||Nacho Libre|-
| Heather Storm || Aslo's girl || None ||
|-
| Shawn McDonald || P. Daddy Faun || Puff Daddy ||
|-
|Lichelle D. Ebner
|Morphed Mystique
|Herself
|X-Men|}

 Parodies 

 Films and TV shows 

 The Chronicles of Narnia: The Lion, the Witch and the Wardrobe (2005) (main parody)
 The Da Vinci Code (2006)
 Nacho Libre (2006)
 Charlie and the Chocolate Factory (2005)
 Snakes on a Plane (2006)
 X-Men: The Last Stand (2006)
 Harry Potter and the Goblet of Fire (2005)
 Borat (2006)
 Rocky III (1982)
 Scarface (1983)
 Pirates of the Caribbean: Dead Man's Chest (2006)
 Superman Returns (2006)
 The Fast and the Furious: Tokyo Drift (2006)
 Click (2006)
 MTV Cribs (2000–2006)
 Harold & Kumar Go to White Castle (2004)
 Punk'd (2003–2007)
 Chappelle's Show (2003)
 Star Wars (1977)
 Saturday Night Live (2005) – "Lazy Sunday" song by The Lonely Island
 The Lord of the Rings (2001)
 Talladega Nights: The Ballad of Ricky Bobby (2006)
 Mission: Impossible III (2006)
 Casino Royale (2006)
 V for Vendetta (2005)
 Enter the Dragon (1973)
 Hustle & Flow (2005)
 [[Get Rich or Die Tryin' (film)|Get Rich or Die Tryin']] (2005)

 Real-life people 

 Mel Gibson
 Lindsay Lohan
 Brad Pitt and Angelina Jolie
 Kanye West
 Ashton Kutcher
 Flavor Flav
 Samuel L. Jackson
 Paris Hilton
 Puff Daddy
 Monty Python

Release
Box officeEpic Movie debuted at number one at the box office with a gross of $18.6 million over the opening weekend. As of May 8, 2007, the film has grossed $86,865,564, with $39,739,367 of that amount earned domestically. The film was an economic success for its producers not least because it had a comparatively low budget, estimated at $20 million (the same as Date Movie).

Critical response
On Rotten Tomatoes the film has an approval rating of 2% based on 66 reviews and an average rating of 2.33/10. The site's critical consensus reads, "A crude comedy with nothing new or insightful to say about the subjects it satirizes." On Metacritic, the film has a score of 17 out of 100 based on 17 critics, indicating "overwhelming dislike". Audiences polled by CinemaScore gave the film an average grade of "C−" on an A+ to F scale.

A. O. Scott of The New York Times called the film "irreverent and also appreciative, dragging its satiric prey down to the lowest pop-cultural denominator" and added, "The humor is coarse and occasionally funny. The archly bombastic score . . . is the only thing you might call witty. But happily, Jennifer Coolidge and Fred Willard show up ... to add some easy, demented class." Mick LaSalle of the San Francisco Chronicle thought "only a complete idiot could think Epic Movie is remotely funny or worth making at all." Describing it as "so bereft of anything resembling wit or inspiration", he wondered, "What were the perpetrators, uh filmmakers, thinking?" In the Los Angeles Times, Alex Chun called the film "nothing more than a disjointed series of scenes and references cobbled together as a backdrop for sophomoric humor." Ronnie Scheib of Variety said it was "epically unfunny" and "unlikely to join the list of blockbusters it lampoons." The Radio Times said "There's very little that's epic about this senseless parody, but then there's very little that's funny about it, either... It's mind-numbingly, tediously unamusing and is so devoid of imagination it even parodies self-mocking films."
The Chicago Reader described the film as being "the cinematic equivalent of a tapeworm", while in his review for The Guardian, John Patterson wrote that "Epic Movie is an epic catastrophe, or an artistic failure of epic proportions, or even an Emetic Piece of Insufferable Crap". The Times expressed surprise that "Penn would stoop so low".

AccoladesEpic Movie'' was nominated for three Golden Raspberry Awards, Worst Remake or Rip-off, Carmen Electra for Worst Supporting Actress, and Jason Friedberg and Aaron Seltzer for Worst Screenplay.

Home video
The film was released on DVD on May 22, 2007, in an unrated version, and a theatrical version as well. As of late 2009, 1,040,120 DVDs were sold, bringing in $16,807,388.

See also
 List of films considered the worst
 List of parody films

References

External links

 
 
 
 

2007 films
2007 comedy films
2007 fantasy films
2000s parody films
American parody films
American fantasy films
Films about cannibalism
20th Century Fox films
2000s English-language films
Fantasy parodies
Works based on Harry Potter
Films about witchcraft
Films about wizards
Films scored by Edward Shearmur
Films directed by Jason Friedberg and Aaron Seltzer
Films shot in California
Films shot in New Jersey
Regency Enterprises films
American slapstick comedy films
Parody films based on James Bond films
2000s American films